Patrick Evans is a Church of England clergyman, born in 1943.  He trained originally to become a solicitor and then worked in marketing and sales management, before training for ordination at Lincoln Theological College and becoming Vicar of St Mildred's, Tenterden and Area Dean of West Charing.

He then became Archdeacon of Maidstone and Diocesan Director of Ordinands, posts he held until 2002, and then from 2002 to his retirement in March 2007 he was Archdeacon of Canterbury in the Church of England.  From 1989 to 2007 he was also an Honorary Canon of Canterbury Cathedral. Before becoming Archdeacon of Maidstone.

He is co-chairman of Canterbury and Rochester Church in Society and has also served as a trustee and board member of numerous Church associations and several secular charities.

References

 

Archdeacons of Canterbury
Archdeacons of Maidstone
Living people
Canons of Canterbury
Alumni of Lincoln Theological College
Year of birth missing (living people)